The Tisza, Tysa or Tisa, is one of the major rivers of Central and Eastern Europe.  Once, it was called "the most Hungarian river" because it flowed entirely within the Kingdom of Hungary. Today, it crosses several national borders.

The Tisza begins near Rakhiv in Ukraine, at the confluence of the White Tisa and Black Tisa, which is at coordinates  (the former springs in the Chornohora mountains; the latter in the Gorgany range).  From there, the Tisza flows west, roughly following Ukraine's borders with Romania and Hungary, then shortly as border between Slovakia and Hungary, later into Hungary, and finally into Serbia.  It enters Hungary at Tiszabecs. It traverses Hungary from north to south. A few kilometers south of the Hungarian city of Szeged, it enters Serbia.  Finally, it joins the Danube near the village of Stari Slankamen in Vojvodina, Serbia.

It contributes about 13% of the Danube's total runoff.

Attila the Hun is said to have been buried under a diverted section of the river Tisza.

Names
The river was known as the Tisia in antiquity; other ancient names for it included Pathissus ( in Ancient Greek and later Tissus (in Latin)), (Pliny, Naturalis historia, 4.25). It may be referred to as the Theiss in older English references, after the German name for the river, . It is known as the Tibisco in Italian, and in older French references (as for instance in relation to the naval battles on the Danube between the Ottoman Empire and the Habsburg Empire in the 17th and 18th centuries) it is often referred to as the Tibisque.

Modern names for the Tisza in the languages of the countries it flows through include:
, ;
, ;
, ;
, ;
 / , .

Regulation
The length of the Tisza in Hungary used to be . It flowed through the Great Hungarian Plain, which is one of the largest flat areas in central Europe. Since plains can cause a river to flow very slowly, the Tisza used to follow a path with many curves and turns, which led to many large floods in the area.

After several small-scale attempts, István Széchenyi organised the "regulation of the Tisza" which started on August 27 1846, and substantially ended in 1880.

Lake Tisza 
In the 1970s, the building of the Tisza Dam at Kisköre started with the purpose of helping to control floods as well as storing water for drought seasons. However, the resulting Lake Tisza became one of the most popular tourist destinations in Hungary since it had similar features to Lake Balaton at drastically cheaper prices and was not crowded.

Navigation 
The Tisza is navigable over much of its course. The river opened up for international navigation only recently; before, Hungary distinguished "national rivers" and "international rivers", indicating whether non-Hungarian vessels were allowed or not. After Hungary joined the European Union, this distinction was lifted and vessels were allowed on the Tisza.

Conditions of navigation differ with the circumstances: when the river is in flood, it is often unnavigable, just as it is at times of extreme drought.

Wildlife
The Tisza has a rich and varied wildlife. Over 200 species of birds reside in the bird reserve of Tiszafüred. The flood plains along the river boast large amounts of diverse plant and animal life. In particular, the yearly "flowering" of the Tisza is considered a local natural wonder. The flowering attracts vast numbers of mayflies which is a well known spectacle.

In September 2020, colonies of magnificent bryozoans were discovered in the river.

Pollution

In early 2000, there was a sequence of serious pollution incidents originating from accidental industrial discharges in Romania. The first, in January 2000, occurred when there was a release of sludge containing cyanide from a Romanian mine and killed 2000 tons of fish. A week later, the third spill occurred at the same mining site at Baia Borsa, staining the river black, possibly including heavy metals.

This series of incidents were described at the time as the most serious environmental disaster to hit central Europe since the Chernobyl disaster. Usage of river water for any purpose was temporarily banned and the Hungarian government pressed the Romanians and the European Union to close all installations that could lead to further pollution.

Examination of river sediments indicates that pollution incidents from mines have occurred for over a century.

Geography

Drainage basin

The Tisza River is part of the Danube River catchment area. It is the tributary with the largest catchment area (~157,000 km2). It accounts for more than 19% of the Danube river basin. The Tisza water system is shared by five countries: Ukraine (8%), Slovakia (10%), Hungary (29%), Romania (46%) and Serbia (7%).

The Tisza River Basin area and average discharge (period from 1946 to 2006) by country

The 1800-2500 m high ridge of the Carpathian Mountains create in a semi circle the northern, eastern and southeastern boundary of the Tisza catchment. The western - southwestern reach of the watershed is comparatively low in some places – on its Hungarian and Serbian parts it is almost flat. The area is divided roughly along the centreline by the Carpathians Mountains, east of which lies the 400-600 m high plateau of the Transylvanian Basin, and the plains to the west. The highest summits of the river basin reach 1,948 m in the Low Tatras (Kráľova hoľa), 2061 m in the Chornogora Mountains (Hoverla), 2303 m in the Rodna Mountains (Pietrosul Rodnei) and even higher in the Retezat Mountains of the Southern Carpathians (Peleaga, 2509 m). Areas above elevations higher than 1600 m occupy only 1% of the total; 46% of the territory lies below 200 m. The Tisza River Basin in the Slovak Republic is predominantly hilly area and the highest mountain peak in Kráľova hoľa - in the Low Tatras Mountain Range at 1,948 m. The lowland area lies in the south, forming the northern edge of the Hungarian Lowland. The lowest point in the Slovak Republic is the village of Streda nad Bodrogom in the eastern Slovak lowland (96 m) in the Bodrog River Basin. The Hungarian and Vojvodina (Serbia) part of the Tisza River Basin is a flat area bordered by small ranges of hills and mountains from the north and dominated by the Hungarian lowland.

Important hydrographic stations along the Tisza River (full list)

Discharge

Average, minimum and maximum discharge of the Tisza River at Tiszabecs (Upper Tisza), Szolnok (Middle Tisza) and Senta (Lower Tisza).

Tributaries

The following rivers are tributaries to the river Tisza:
Vișeu (entering at Valea Vișeului) 
Kosivska (entering at Luh) 
Shopurka (entering at Velykyi Bychkiv) 
Iza (entering at Sighetu Marmației) 
Sarasău 
Bic 
Săpânța 
Șaroș
Teresva (entering near Teresva) 
Baia 
Valea lui Francisc
Tereblia (entering at Bushtyno) 
Rika (entering near Khust) 
Batar 
Borzhava 
Tur 
Szamos (entering near Vásárosnamény)
Someșul Mare (in Dej)
Șieu (in Beclean)
Bistrița (near Bistrița)
Someșul Mic (in Dej)
Someșul Cald (in Gilău)
Someșul Rece (in Gilău)
Kraszna (entering in Vásárosnamény)
Bodrog (entering in Tokaj)
Ondava (near Cejkov)
Latorica (near Cejkov)
Laborec (near Oborín)
Uzh (near Pavlovce nad Uhom)
Cirocha (in Humenné)
Stara
Vicha
Kerepets
Sajó (entering near Tiszaújváros)
Hornád (near Kesznyéten)
Eger (entering in Poroszló)
Zagyva (entering in Szolnok)
Körös (entering near Csongrád)
Sebes-Körös (near Gyoma)
Berettyó (Barcău) (in Szeghalom)
White-Körös (near Gyula)
Black-Körös (near Gyula)
Maros (entering near Szeged)
Arieș (near Gura Arieșului)
Târnava (near Teiuș)
Târnava Mare (in Blaj)
Târnava Mică (in Blaj)
Aranca (entering near Padej)
Čik (entering near Bačko Petrovo Selo)
Jegrička (entering near Žabalj)
Bega (entering near Titel)

Cities and towns
The Tisza (Tisa) flows through the following countries and cities (ordered from the source to mouth):

Rakhiv
Tiachiv
Khust
Vynohradiv

Malé Trakany
Veľké Trakany
Biel

Sighetu Marmației

Vásárosnamény
Záhony
Tokaj
Tiszalök
Tiszaújváros
Tiszafüred
Szolnok
Tiszakécske
Csongrád
Szentes
Szeged

Kanjiža
Novi Kneževac
Senta
Ada
Mol
Bačko Petrovo Selo
Bečej
Novi Bečej
Titel

See also 
 Tice (wetlands)
 Ečka fish pond

References

External links

Backabanat.com, About Tisza
Historia.hu, the Living Tisza 
River Basin Report: Tisza River Ywat.org
Awarded "EDEN - European Destinations of Excellence" non traditional tourist destination 2010

 
Bačka
Banat
Border rivers
Braided rivers in Ukraine
Geography of Bács-Kiskun County
Geography of Vojvodina
Hungary–Slovakia border
Hungary–Serbia border
Hungary–Ukraine border
International rivers of Europe
Ramsar sites in Slovakia
Rivers of Hungary
Rivers of Maramureș County
Rivers of Romania
Rivers of Serbia
Rivers of Slovakia
Rivers of Zakarpattia Oblast
Tributaries of the Danube